Stagecoach West is the trading name of Cheltenham & Gloucester Omnibus Company Limited, a bus operator providing services in Gloucestershire, Bristol, Swindon, Oxfordshire, Wiltshire, North Somerset and Herefordshire, in the West of England. The company is a subsidiary of Stagecoach Group.

History

In 1983, Bristol Omnibus Company's Gloucestershire-based operations were transferred to the Cheltenham & Gloucester Omnibus Company. In 1985, the National Bus Company's Swindon and District operation was transferred to the same company. In 1986, all the assets were transferred to a new legal entity, Western Travel.

In 1986, Western Travel was privatised in a management buyout and in December 1987 purchased Midland Red South. In 1993, Western Travel purchased Circle Line of Gloucester (primarily a school bus operator, who had started to compete on regular bus routes) before being sold to Stagecoach in November 1993.

In 1988, National Welsh Omnibus Services was privatised in a management buyout. After being placed in receivership in January 1992, the Eastern Division was purchased by Stagecoach South Wales. After the Western Travel purchase, the Wye & Dean operations were transferred to Stagecoach West.

In August/September 2017, four Enviro 200's from Stroud and eight Enviro 200's alongside the four Optare Solo's from Cheltenham that were used for service 99 (primarily run to transport staff and walking patients between Gloucester Royal and Cheltenham General Hospitals, before the contract moved to Pulhams Coaches), were transferred to the South Gloucestershire Bus & Coach Depot in Patchway, along with Stroud's 84/85/86/621/622 and Gloucester's 60/62 Routes.

In July 2018, Service 60 was transferred back to Gloucester Depot, with the 62 remaining operated by Bristol but only running between Dursley and Bristol.

In September 2018, the company took over the operation of eight routes in the Bristol and Bath areas from Wessex Bus.  Stagecoach purchased nine of their vehicles, three of which were found to have serious defects and were subsequently scrapped.

On 1 September 2019, Stagecoach West took over operation of the X5 (Weston-super-Mare to Cribbs Causeway) and Severn Express (Newport to Bristol) routes from First West of England but the X5 would be withdrawn in June 2020, as a result of low ridership, with the route transferring back to First. The Severn Express would also be withdrawn in the same month for the same reason and be replaced by the T7 ran by Newport bus which began operating on the 4th January 2021. In October 2019, Stagecoach West took over the South Gloucestershire Bus & Coach business with 53 vehicles.

On 4 April 2020, service 62 transferred to CT+ Bristol.

In February 2021, it was announced that Stagecoach West would merge with neighbouring Stagecoach Oxfordshire. The HQ of the combined operating company is in Gloucester and would see Oxfordshire's three depots and 4 outstations, along with around 500 vehicles, move to West's ownership. It would also see the final part of the takeover, that of the Stagecoach Midlands Banbury Depot.

Depots
Stagecoach West has nine depots:
Banbury (Canal Street)
Bristol (Gipsy Patch Lane, Patchway)
Cheltenham (Lansdown Industrial Estate, Gloucester Road)
Gloucester (London Road)
Oxford (Horspath Road)
Milkwall
Stroud (London Road)
Swindon (Cheney Manor Industrial Estate)
Witney (Corn Street)
There are also outstations at Bicester, Coleford, Chipping Norton and Grove.

As of October 2022, the Stagecoach West fleet consists of 270 buses and coaches.

Services
Stagecoach West mainly operates services in Gloucestershire, Bristol, Herefordshire, Wiltshire, Oxfordshire and into South Gloucestershire, although some routes serve more distant destinations including Brackley, Hereford, Monmouth and Bath.

Routes branded as Stagecoach Gold have vehicles of a higher specification and provide more frequent, higher profile or interurban journeys. These services are:
7 Woodstock to Oxford
55 Chippenham to Swindon
94/94X Cheltenham to Gloucester
S3 Chipping Norton/Charlbury to Oxford
S5 Bicester to Oxford
S6 Swindon to Oxford
S9 Wantage to Oxford

When Stagecoach West bought South Gloucestershire Bus & Coach in November 2019, it took over operation of its existing local bus, private hire and Megabus work. The fleet was also taken over, but gradually replaced with newer vehicles sourced from across Stagecoach Group.

After merging with Stagecoach Oxfordshire in February 2021, it took over the operation of their Oxford Tube coach service between Oxford and London.

In March 2021, the Bath Clean Air Zone came into force and affected services 69/620. As Stroud Depot had no vehicles meeting the zone requirement, they had to temporarily swap four Enviro 200s from Cheltenham with four of their own Optare Solos.

21 new Scania Enviro 400MMC double-decker vehicles were delivered for Gloucester Depot's 10 and 97/98 route in June 2021. They carry the new Stagecoach "Long Distance" livery. This meant the 10 route is no longer classed as Gold. These new buses commenced driver training operations in mid-June, operating from the Gloucester Depot, and many had entered service by the end of the month.

Oxford Tube
The Oxford Tube currently operates a fleet of 24 Plaxton Panorama vehicles, built on Volvo B11RLE chassis double decker coaches alongside 6 Vanhool Astonomega on limited stops services between Oxford and London Victoria.

On 3 March 2014 Stagecoach Group announced its biggest vehicle order to date. Costing Stagecoach over £100 million in total, it included 26 new VanHool TX Astromega coaches to operate the Oxford Tube service. The first of the new coaches entered service on 16 July 2014 with the entire fleet following shortly after. The new coaches increased comfort and facilities for passengers including more leg room, 4G WiFi, power sockets and USB ports in selected seats and a brand new audio information system providing passengers with departure and arrival information and the top deck also features a panoramic glass sun roof allowing more natural light into the coach.

In 2020, Stagecoach announced that it would replace their current Tube fleet with 34 new Plaxton Panorama vehicles, built on Volvo B11RLE chassis.

See also 
Buses in Bristol
Buses in Swindon

References

External links

Stagecoach Group bus operators in England
Transport companies established in 1983
Transport in Bristol
Transport in Cheltenham
Transport in Gloucestershire
Transport in Monmouthshire
Transport in Oxfordshire
Transport in Swindon
Transport in Wiltshire
1983 establishments in England
Bus operators in Bristol
Bus operators in Herefordshire
Bus operators in Wiltshire
Bus operators in Oxfordshire